Zalmoxis Peak is the rocky peak rising to 2625 m in Bearskin Ridge on the east side of Sentinel Range in Ellsworth Mountains, Antarctica.  It is surmounting Patton Glacier to the northwest and Crosswell Glacier to the southeast.

The feature is named after the mythical Thracian king and deity Zalmoxis.

Location
US mapping in 1988.

Maps
 Vinson Massif.  Scale 1:250 000 topographic map.  Reston, Virginia: US Geological Survey, 1988.
 Antarctic Digital Database (ADD). Scale 1:250000 topographic map of Antarctica. Scientific Committee on Antarctic Research (SCAR). Since 1993, regularly updated.

Notes

References
 Zalmoxis Peak. SCAR Composite Antarctic Gazetteer.
 Bulgarian Antarctic Gazetteer. Antarctic Place-names Commission. (details in Bulgarian, basic data in English)

External links
 Zalmoxis Peak. Copernix satellite image

Mountains of Ellsworth Land
Bulgaria and the Antarctic